Sheslon Lucas Lima Sant'Ana or simply Sheslon (born January 4, 1987 in Barão de Cocais), is a Brazilian right back. He currently plays for Boa.

Contract
10 February 2005 to 6 February 2010

External links
 CBF
 globoesporte
 esporte.com.br
 lancenet
 yahoo

1987 births
Living people
Brazilian footballers
Campeonato Brasileiro Série A players
Clube Atlético Mineiro players
Esporte Clube Democrata players
Association football defenders